These are the international rankings of Kenya

International rankings

References

Kenya